Herbert Müller (born 3 September 1962 in Timișoara) is a Romanian-German handball coach and former handball player. He is currently in charge of Thüringer HC of the German Bundesliga, and beside his club duties he also serves as the head coach of the Austria women's national handball team.

Career
He was born to ethnic Banat Swabians parents, Franz and Anna Müller in Timișoara, and started to play handball for the local team Poli Timișoara in 1976. Four years later he left the country with his family because of the hard times under the communist regime in Romania, and settled in Germany. He continued his playing career in Augsburg, where he ended his career in 1988.

He began coaching in 1984 at TSG Augsburg, while he was still a player. In 1999 he took the hot seat of 1. FC Nürnberg, with them he achieved his biggest successes, winning two domestic championships and two domestic cup titles. In addition, he also won the EHF Challenge Cup in 2004.

In 2008, Müller became the head coach of the Romanian team Rulmentul Brașov. He spent a year and a half with Rulmentul before the club developed financial problems.

Müller moved back to Germany, signing for Thüringer HC in July 2010. He brought the Bundesliga title and the German Cup for THC in 2011 for the first time in the history of the club.

Personal life
He is married and has two daughters, Nadia (b. 2001) and Vanessa (b. 2007). Herbert's brother, Helfried is also a handball expert, serving as the assistant coach of Thüringer HC.

Müller was a mathematics docent at the Institut für Integration in Nuremberg.

References

1962 births
Living people 
German handball coaches
German male handball players 
Romanian male handball players  
Sportspeople from Timișoara
German people of German-Romanian descent
Romanian emigrants to West Germany
Handball coaches of international teams
West German male handball players
Romanian handball coaches